Bhavatharana is a 2015 Sri Lankan Sinhala historical drama film directed by Devinda Kongahage as his film directorial debut. The film is co-produced by Mawathagama S. Rajaputra Weerasinghe with Shirani Keppetipola for Castoria Films and Rajaputhra Productions. It stars Malini Fonseka and newcomer Sajeew Rajaputra in lead roles whereas Sriyantha Mendis, Mahendra Perera, Udayanthi Kulatunga, Roshan Pilapitiya, Roshan Ravindra, and Chandika Nanayakkara made supportive roles.

Plot
The film is based on the political and cultural events of King Keerthi Sri Rajasinghe and his reign.

Cast
 Malini Fonseka
 Sajeew Rajaputra as Pulasthi 
 Sriyantha Mendis
 Mahendra Perera
 Udayanthi Kulatunga
 Roshan Pilapitiya
 Roshan Ravindra
 Chandika Nanayakkara
 Kumudu Nishantha
 Srimal Wedisinghe
 Asela Jayakody
 Kanchana Kodithuwakku
 Sanketh Wickramarage
 Darshan Dharmaraj
 Chitanjara Warakagoda
 Deepani Silva
 Richard Manamudali
 Ganendri Kongahage

Production
The research for the film began in 2009, based on Professor Lona Devaraja's book, "The Kandian Kingdom". The director stayed in temples for a long time, collected hard-to-find information, studied other works written in English, and collected as much material as was not written in the vernacular or the Mahavamsa.

Nishantha Pradeep is the cinematographer, Praveen Jayaratne is the editor, whereas Narada Dhananji Thotagamuwa and Premalal Liyanage are the make-up artists. Manoj Wickramarasinghe and Chinthaka Wijeratne joined as the art directors, Kalinga Gihan Perera is the Sound mixer and choreographer. Music is composed by Naaratne Gamage and Jagath Wickramasinghe. The lyrics, screenplay and direction are done by Devinda Kongahage. The filming was completed in 2013 but had to wait eight years to make official screen. The film was officially released on 3 December 2021 in Ridma theatre cinemas. The film also became the first Sinhala film to be screened in Kandy City Center Cinema when it was screened on 10 December 2021.

Sameera Hasun, Narada Ratnayake, Shirley Samarasinghe, Asanka, Asanga and Sampath are the assistant directors. Gunathilaka Ranawaka in Production Management. Shashika Abeywickrema, Buddhika Lokuketiya and Sulochana Akalanka contributed. Still photos by Dhammika Pathiratne. Technical work by Ruwan Karunaratne, Chaminda Pathiratne and Buddhika Serasinghe. Production coordination by Nayani Kongahage.

Recognition
The film won the award for the Best Picture at all three international festivals: 2015 Delhi International Film Festival, the Shanghai Golden Chimes International Film Festival and the Asia Tourism Indus Chinese Film Festival.

References

External links
 Official trailer

2015 films
2010s Sinhala-language films
2015 drama films
Sri Lankan historical drama films
Films set in the Kandyan period
2010s historical drama films